Vexillum leforti is a species of small sea snail, marine gastropod mollusk in the family Costellariidae, the ribbed miters.

Description
The length of the shell attains 20 mm, its diameter 6.2 mm.

Distribution
This marine species occurs off Japan.

References

External links
 Turner, H.; Salisbury, R. A. (1999). Three new costellariid species from Japan, Papua New Guinea and other Indo-Pacific locations. Apex. 14 (3-4): 73-80

leforti
Gastropods described in 1999